Li Ronghao (born July 11, 1985, in Bengbu, Anhui) is a Chinese singer-songwriter, actor and producer. He has released six studio albums, three EPs, and won the Golden Melody Award for Best New Singer in 2013. He has also acted in 3 movies, most notably the hit movie Duckweed. He has held 3 huge concert tours and become the first singer from the Chinese mainland to hold concerts at Hong Kong Coliseum and Taipei Arena. He was ranked 59th on the Forbes China Celebrity 100 List for 2020.

History 
Li Ronghao's first studio album, Model, was released in 2013 with label Linfair Records. The album was nominated for Best Album and Li was nominated for Best Male Singer, Best Lyricist, Best Newcomer and Best Producer at the 25th Golden Melody Awards, and won the Best New Singer award.

In August 2014. Li signed with label Warner Records. Later that year, he released the concept EP Dear Composer and quickly gained popularity, becoming MusicRadio China's most popular new singer. In September that year, he released his second album, Ronghao Li. This album won the Best Chinese Album award as well as the Most Influential New Singer award at the 2015 QQ Annual Music Festival. The song King of Comedy from Ronghao Li was nominated for the Best Lyricist Award at the 26th Golden Melody Awards as well as winning the Song of the Year award during the 5th Global Pop Song Charts.

His third album An Ideal, released in 2015, received average to positive reviews on Chinese ratings site Douban, with many critics remarking on Li's slight change of style. The song Stubborn Love (不将就) from An Ideal hit number 1 on Taiwan's iTunes Popular Singles Chart in April 2015.

Li made a special appearance in the movie Duckweed, which was released in January 2017. He also participated in the second season The Voice of China as an advisor to Coach Eason and their team won the Best Team award that season.

In 2018, Li starred in the film Keep Calm and Be a Superstar alongside Li Yitong and Eason Chan. Li was the vocal instructor for Idol Producer. He reprised the role for the second season in 2019. Li also released his 5th album “Ear” in 2018. The song  If I Were Young was a massive hit in Taiwan and Mainland China, and the music video reached over 100 million views on YouTube. The song was ranked 2nd on the China Billboard Radio Top 10 Songs, only behind Jay Chou's Waiting For You.

In 2019, he served as a coach on the fourth season of Sing! China (a rebranded version of The Voice of China). Later that year, he was crowned as the winning coach of the Sing China 2019 as Xing Hanming from Team Ronghao won the competition.

In 2020, he released his 6th album "Sparrow". He continued to serve as a coach on the 5th Season of Sing! China 2020 with Nicholas Tse, Li Jian, and Chris Li. Li ranked 59th on the Forbes China Celebrity 100 list for 2020.

Personal life
In 2019, Li Ronghao married Taiwanese singer Rainie Yang.

Discography

Studio Albums

EPs

Singles

Tours 

 Born Tour (2015 - 2015)
 An Ideal World Tour (2016 - 2018)
 If I Were Young World Tour (2019 - Ongoing)

Filmography

Duckweed (2017)
Keep Calm and Be a Superstar (2018)
Always Miss You (2019)
Idol Producer (2018)
Youth with You 1 (2019)
Youth with You 3 (2021)

Awards and accolades

References

1985 births
Living people
People from Bengbu
Chinese male singer-songwriters
Chinese Mandopop singers
Chinese record producers
Chinese guitarists
Mandopop singer-songwriters
MAMA Award winners
Hui singers
Singers from Anhui
21st-century guitarists
21st-century Chinese male singers